The Surin Islands is an archipelago of five islands in the Andaman Sea, 60 km from the Thai mainland. Administratively, the islands are part of Tambon Ko Phra Thong, Khura Buri District, in Phang Nga Province, Thailand.

Geography
The five islands are Ko Surin Nuea, Ko Surin Tai, Ko Ri, Ko Kai, and Ko Klang, with Ko Surin Nuea and Ko Surin Tai being the two main islands of the group. The Thai-Burmese oceanic border is a few kilometers north of the park. Christie Island, Burma's southernmost point, lies 18 km to the north of Ko Surin Nuea and about 100 km to the south is Mu Ko Similan National Park.

Richelieu Rock, a rock in the middle of the sea, about 10 km southwest of the Ko Surin, is commonly referred to one as one of the ten best dive spots in the world. Named after Andreas du Plessis de Richelieu, the first (and only foreign) commander-in-chief of the Thai Navy, the remote rock is home to some of the largest marine life species in Thailand. Other popular dive sites include Hin Kong, Ko Torinla, and Ko Chi.

National Park
Mu Ko Surin National Park (อุทยานแห่งชาติหมู่เกาะสุรินทร์) encompasses the islands and their surrounding waters. The park covers an area of 88,282 rai ~ . It contains the Surin Islands and the surrounding waters. Of the protected area,  or 80 percent is ocean. The park was gazetted as the 30th national park of Thailand on 9 July 1981. The park is closed during rainy season, 1 May-31 October, every year. There were 54,171 visitors in 2019.

Climate
A hot season runs from mid-February to May. The rainy season is from mid-May to October, the rainiest month. The yearly average rainfall is more than 3,000 millimetres with average humidity is 83 percent. The park is closed during rainy season, 1 May-31 October, every year.

The best time for diving is from December to April with dry conditions, minimum wind and an average water temperature at around 29 °C. February to April is the more ideal time to spot large pelagic species like manta rays. Due to marine conservation initiatives diving is not allowed in certain areas of the national park.

Flora and fauna

Primary rain forest covers most area of the park. Beach forest can be found in beach areas where Barringtonia and Cerbera odollam abound. Mangrove forest can be found in the mud and brackish water of Mae Yai Bay.

Surveys have found:
 Ninety-one types of birds including 57 local species. Others are migrating species. 
 Twenty-two mammal species including 12 types of bats.
 Marine mammals such as Bryde's whales live around. 
 Six species of reptiles such as Indian or Bengal monitors, water monitors, skinks, and reticulated pythons.
 Sea turtles still nest on the Surin islands, with two species coming ashore to lay their eggs, critically endangered hawksbill and green turtles. In the early-1990s some rare olive ridley turtles were spotted.

Important Bird Area
The national park has been designated an Important Bird Area (IBA) by BirdLife International because it supports populations of Vulnerable large green pigeons.

Moken people

The Surin Islands host two small communities of the small ethnic Moken minority, known as "chao lay" or "sea gypsies". The Moken population of the Surin Island averages around 150 persons.

The Moken are three distinct tribes living on the Andaman Coast of Burma and Thailand: the Moken of the Mergui archipelago, the Moklen of Phang Nga Province, and the Urak Lawoi living from Phuket south to Satun. With Austronesian roots, their language, culture, and lifestyle are unique, and they have a history of peaceful coexistence with mainland neighbors. The Moken, proper, have a long history of living in the Mergui archipelago between Burma and the islands of Thailand's North Andaman coast. As sea nomads, the Moken used to spend most of their lives on traditional houseboats known as kabang, moving from bay to bay depending on the wind and weather. During the monsoon rains, families would come together and build temporary villages on protected beaches.

The Moken do not have a written language and their history is passed down orally through folklore from generation to generation. Family connections are strong and dependable. Furthermore, the Moken language has no native words for individual possession which is reflected in a culture of sharing and giving.

The Moken are animists and have great understanding and respect for their environment and natural resources. In past times, the Moken people were subsistence hunter-gathers, trading shells, sea cucumbers, and fish for rice and other necessities. They use over 80 plant species for food, 28 for medicinal purposes, and 105 for shelter, handicrafts and other purposes.

See also
 List of islands of Thailand
List of national parks of Thailand
List of Protected Areas Regional Offices of Thailand

References

External links

 Phang Nga Tourist Association

Islands of Thailand
Islands of the Andaman Sea
Geography of Phang Nga province
National parks of Thailand
Tourist attractions in Phang Nga province
Important Bird Areas of Thailand
Important Bird Areas of Indian Ocean islands